The Perth Track Classic is an annual outdoor track and field meeting held in February or March at the Western Australian Athletics Stadium in Perth, Australia. It is part of the national Australian Athletics Tour.

Meet Records

Men

Women

References

Annual track and field meetings
Athletics competitions in Australia